Purpuriconus has become a synonym of Conus (Dauciconus) Cotton, 1945 represented as Conus Linnaeus, 1758. These are sea snails, marine gastropod mollusks in the genus Conus, family Conidae, the cone snails and their allies.

Species
Species within the former genus Purpuriconus include:

 Purpuriconus alainallaryi (Bozzetti & Monnier, 2009): synonym of Conus alainallaryi Bozzetti & Monnier, 2009
 Purpuriconus arangoi (Sarasúa, 1977): synonym of  Conus arangoi Sarasúa, 1977 
 Purpuriconus belizeanus Petuch & Sargent, 2011: synonym of Conus belizeanus (Petuch & Sargent, 2011) 
 Purpuriconus bessei (Petuch, 1992): synonym of  Conus bessei Petuch, 1992 
 Purpuriconus cardinalis (Hwass in Bruguière, 1792): synonym of  Conus cardinalis Hwass in Bruguière, 1792 
 Purpuriconus caysalensis (L. Raybaudi & Prati, 1994): synonym of Conus caysalensis L. Raybaudi & Prati, 1994
 Purpuriconus deynzerorum (Petuch, 1995): synonym of  Conus deynzerorum Petuch, 1995 
 Purpuriconus dianthus (G. B. Sowerby III, 1882): synonym of Conus dianthus G. B. Sowerby III, 1882
 Purpuriconus donnae (Petuch, 1998): synonym of Conus donnae Petuch, 1998
 Purpuriconus edwardpauli (Petuch, 1998): synonym of Conus edwardpauli Petuch, 1998
 Purpuriconus eleutheraensis (Petuch, 2013): synonym of Conus eleutheraensis (Petuch, 2013)
 Purpuriconus explorator (Vink, 1990): synonym of  Conus explorator Vink, 1990 
 Purpuriconus harasewychi (Petuch, 1987): synonym of Conus harasewychi Petuch, 1987
 Purpuriconus havanensis (Aguayo & Farfante, 1947): synonym of  Conus havanensis Aguayo & Farfante, 1947 
 Purpuriconus hennequini (Petuch, 1993): synonym of  Conus hennequini Petuch, 1993 
 Purpuriconus hilli (Petuch, 1990): synonym of Conus hilli Petuch, 1990
 Purpuriconus inconstans (E.A. Smith, 1877): synonym of  Conus inconstans E. A. Smith, 1877 
 Purpuriconus jacarusoi (Petuch, 1998): synonym of  Conus jacarusoi Petuch, 1998 
 Purpuriconus jucundus (G.B. Sowerby III, 1887): synonym of  Conus jucundus G. B. Sowerby III, 1887 
 Purpuriconus kalafuti (da Motta, 1987): synonym of  Conus kalafuti da Motta, 1987 
 Purpuriconus kirkandersi (Petuch, 1987): synonym of Conus kirkandersi Petuch, 1987
 Purpuriconus kulkulcan (Petuch, 1980): synonym of  Conus kulkulcan Petuch, 1980 
 Purpuriconus lucaya (Petuch, 2000): synonym of Conus lucaya Petuch, 2000
 Purpuriconus maculiferus (G. B. Sowerby I, 1833): synonym of Conus maculiferus G. B. Sowerby I, 1833
 Purpuriconus magellanicus (Hwass in Bruguière, 1792): synonym of  Conus magellanicus Hwass in Bruguière, 1792 
 Purpuriconus magnottei (Petuch, 1987): synonym of  Conus magnottei Petuch, 1987 
 Purpuriconus mayaguensis Nowell-Usticke, 1968: synonym of  Conus mayaguensis Nowell-Usticke, 1968 
 Purpuriconus orion (Broderip, 1833): synonym of Conus orion Broderip, 1833
 Purpuriconus ortneri (Petuch, 1998): synonym of  Conus ortneri Petuch, 1998 
 Purpuriconus pseudocardinalis (Coltro, 2004): synonym of Conus pseudocardinalis Coltro, 2004
 Purpuriconus richardbinghami (Petuch, 1993): synonym of  Conus richardbinghami Petuch, 1993 
 Purpuriconus rosalindensis (Petuch, 1993): synonym of  Conus rosalindensis Petuch, 1998 
 Purpuriconus sahlbergi (da Motta & Harland, 1986): synonym of  Conus sahlbergi da Motta & Harland, 1986 
 Purpuriconus sphacelatus (G.B. Sowerby I, 1833): synonym of  Conus sphacelatus G. B. Sowerby I, 1833 
 Purpuriconus stanfieldi (Petuch, 1998): synonym of Conus stanfieldi Petuch, 1998
 Purpuriconus theodorei (Petuch, 2000): synonym of Conus theodorei Petuch, 2000
 Purpuriconus velaensis (Petuch, 1993): synonym of  Conus velaensis Petuch, 1993 
 Purpuriconus vittatus (Hwass in Bruguière, 1792): synonym of  Conus vittatus Hwass in Bruguière, 1792 
 Purpuriconus ziczac (Mühlfeld, 1816): synonym of  Conus ziczac Mühlfeld, 1816 
 Purpuriconus zylmanae (Petuch, 1998): synonym of  Conus zylmanae Petuch, 1998

References

External links
 To World Register of Marine Species

Conidae